Madvi Hidma (born c.1981) is the youngest member of the Central Committee of Communist Party of India (Maoist). Hidma is  allegedly responsible for various attacks on the security forces in Chhattisgarh, and the 2013 Naxal attack in Darbha valley. A bounty has been placed for his capture.

Career
Hidma was born in Purvati village of south Sukma in the Indian state of Chhattisgarh. He is also known as Hidmalu alias Santosh and is the face of Maoist  in Bastar. After completion of education up to class 10, he joined the Party and became a master strategist of military operation and guerrilla warfare.

Hidma was arrested in 2016 along with six other alleged naxals, at the time he was considered a low-level participant. About that time, Hidma became the area commander of People’s Liberation Guerrilla Army Battalion No 1 and an active member of the Dandakaranya Special Zonal Committee of the CPI (Maoist), which operates in the Sukma, Dantewada and Bijapur areas. He was promoted to the Party's Central Committee as the youngest member. It is believed that Hidma is one of the masterminds behind a number of fierce attacks on security personnel that took place about a decade ago, including the April 2010 Maoist attack in Dantewada and 2017 Sukma attack. All told he is cited as being responsible for twenty-six separate attacks. Indian Agencies have also declared a ₹45 Lakh bounty on his head.

2021 activities
Hidma was the objective of the security forces' planned 3 April 2021 attack on the Maoists; their intent had been to capture Madvi Hidma along with his associates. The planned attack of approximately 2,000 security forces, consisting of CRPF's specialised jungle warfare unit Commando Battalion for Resolute Action (CoBRA) combined with some of its regular battalions, and with units of District Reserve Guard (DRG) of Chhattisgarh Police was in turn ambushed by about 400 guerrilla. In the five hour battle, there were twenty-three deaths among the security forces as per the police report: eight CRPF, eight from the district reserve group and six special task force members. Also thirty-three others were listed as casualties, with thirteen being severely injured. In this battle the Maoists lost around fifteen members of people's liberation guerrilla army including a woman who was killed in the attack as per the police. The ambush occurred in the south Bastar forest where security intel had indicated that a major meeting of militants was to occur.

References

Living people
Anti-revisionists
Indian guerrillas
Indian Marxists
Naxalite–Maoist insurgency
People from Sukma district
1981 births